Death Line is a 1972 horror film written and directed by Gary Sherman and starring Donald Pleasence, Norman Rossington, David Ladd, Sharon Gurney, Hugh Armstrong, and Christopher Lee. Its plot follows two university students who find themselves at the centre of an investigation involving a man who goes missing on the London Underground.

A co-production between the United Kingdom and the United States, Death Line was conceived by American writer-director Sherman, and filmed in London. It was released theatrically in the United Kingdom in November 1972 before premiering in the United States in 1972 under the alternative title, Raw Meat.

Plot
Late one night at the Russell Square station in the London Underground, university students Patricia and her American exchange student boyfriend Alex find an unconscious man on the stairwell. Fearing that he may be diabetic, Patricia checks his wallet and finds a card that reads James Manfred, OBE. They inform a policeman but find that Manfred has vanished. Inspector Calhoun is assigned to look into the disappearance. Calhoun questions Alex and suggests that he and Patricia robbed the man.

Calhoun's colleague tells him about the history of the London Underground, particularly the Victorian railway workers who constructed the tunnels under dire conditions, and an urban legend that a group of descendants who survived an 1892 cave-in still live below ground. Meanwhile, one of the last surviving members of a family of these railway workers watches his pregnant female companion die; they have survived in the underground by resorting to cannibalism of the patrons. In an empty chamber, Manfred's body lies, mutilated. The man, now left in complete solitude, goes into a rage and brutally murders three maintenance workers.

One evening, Alex and Patricia take a train home and get off at Holborn station. Patricia realises she forgot her textbooks on the train. Alex attempts to retrieve them, but the doors close before he can exit; Patricia yells that she will meet him at home. Once the train leaves, however, Patricia is attacked by the cannibal. When she fails to meet him at their flat, Alex seeks help from Calhoun, who is dismissive. Alex returns to Holborn station and enters the tunnel. He breaches an abandoned area of the Underground and finds remnants of the miners who worked there over a century ago. Meanwhile, Patricia awakens in the cannibal's lair. She finds him to be aphasic and unable to communicate with her, although he is capable of uttering one phrase, "mind the doors". She hits him over the head and manages to escape into a tunnel. He corners her and attempts to communicate with her, but becomes frustrated and violent.

Alex finds them and begins fighting with the cannibal, seriously wounding him with a kick to the head. Patricia begs Alex not to hurt him, and they watch as the cannibal stumbles into a passageway. Calhoun and several other detectives discover Alex and Patricia. As they search through the abandoned section, they uncover a room full of corpses laid in bunk bedsthe generations of survivors from the cave-in that occurred a century beforeincluding the cannibal, bleeding profusely, apparently dead. The detectives return to meet Alex and Patricia, and head to the station platform. After they leave, the cannibal is heard screaming "mind the doors!" once more before the credits roll.

Cast

Production

Hugh Armstrong's role was originally to be played by Marlon Brando, but Brando had to back out when his son Christian became ill with pneumonia.

Christopher Lee agreed to do the film for scale, because he wanted to work with Donald Pleasence. Despite this, the two do not share the screen together for the majority of Lee's only scene, due to their large height difference. Director Gary Sherman kept them in separate shots until Lee sits down at the end of the scene, so that he would not have issues fitting them both into the same frame.

Aldwych (formerly Strand) Underground Station was used for underground sequences, as it was only open for weekday Peak services since 1962, and was subsequently closed completely in 1994. Puzzlingly the shots of the platform at "Russell Square" show the exit sign stating "Way Out and to District Line" – there's no connection to the District Lane at Russell Square. The sign had a section blacked out. It would normally read "Way out and to Temple Station (District Line)". Temple station was the nearest station on the District and Circle line to Aldwych.

Release
Death Line premiered in London on 17 November 1972 as a double bill with The Triple Echo and was later released in the United States under the title Raw Meat on 3 October 1973. In the United States, it was released in an edited cut to avoid an X rating. American International Pictures, the film's distributor, retitled the film for its American release, along with a marketing campaign that made it appear as though it were a zombie film. In Los Angeles, it was paired as a double bill alongside the comedy-horror film Cannibal Girls (1973).

Home media
Metro-Goldwyn-Mayer (MGM) released the film on DVD in North American on 26 August 2003. A region 2 edition of the film was released in the UK by Network on 3 April 2006. On 5 April 2011, the film was re-released on DVD in a six-film set alongside other MGM horror titles, such as Pumpkinhead (1988), Dolls (1987), Scarecrows (1988), Sometimes They Come Back (1991), and Invasion of the Body Snatchers (1978). On 27 June 2017, Blue Underground released the film in a Collector's Edition Blu-ray & DVD combination pack. On 27 August 2018 the film was released on Blu-ray in the UK by Network. This version is notable for featuring the original 'X' certificate card from the BBFC at the start of the film.

Critical response

Roger Ebert of the Chicago Sun-Times called the film "a good debut, but it's undermined by several vast improbabilities in the script and by the painfully inept performance of one of its leads, David Ladd." Robin Wood of The Village Voice praised the film, writing that it "vies with Night of the Living Dead (1968) for the most horrible horror film ever. It is, I think, decidedly the better film: more powerfully structured, more complex, and more humanly involved. Its horrors are not gratuitous; it is an essential part of its achievement to create, in the underground world, the most terrible conditions in which human life can continue to exist and remain recognizably human. [It] is strong without being schematic; one can't talk of allegory in the strict sense, but the action consistently carries resonances beyond its literal meaning."

Ramsey Campbell, in a review cut from The Penguin Encyclopedia of Horror and the Supernatural, but reprinted later, calls Death Line "an unusually bleak and harrowing horror film...very little in the film offers the audience any relief from the plight of the Man...The violence would be intolerable if it were not for the tragic dimensions of the film, but Hugh Armstrong's performance is one of the greatest and most moving in horror films."

See also 
 List of London Underground-related fiction

References

External links
 
 
 
 

1972 films
1972 horror films
1970s slasher films
American slasher films
British slasher films
Films about cannibalism
Films directed by Gary Sherman
Films set on the London Underground
Films produced by Paul Maslansky
1970s English-language films
1970s American films
1970s British films